4-Methylbenzaldehyde is the aromatic aldehyde with the formula CH3C6H4CHO. It is a colorless liquid. Commercially available, it may be prepared from the Friedel-Crafts formylation of toluene with carbon monoxide and hydrogen chloride under Gattermann-Koch conditions. 4-Methylbenzaldehyde has a cherry-like scent similar to benzaldehyde.

References

Benzaldehydes